Chris Kraus may refer to:

 Chris Kraus (American writer) (born 1955), American writer and filmmaker
 Chris Kraus (director) (born 1963), German author and film director